Michaela Curtis (born 21 October 1993) is a field hockey player from New Zealand.

Career

Junior National Teams
In 2010, Curtis was a member of the New Zealand Under 18 team at the 2010 Summer Youth Olympics in Singapore. This was the first edition of field hockey at the Summer Youth Olympics, where the New Zealand team won bronze. Curtis scored the winning goal, in golden goal extra time, to defeat South Korea 5–4.

Curtis once again represented New Zealand at a junior level in 2013, at the Junior World Cup in Mönchengladbach. The New Zealand Under 21 team finished in 9th place, defeating hosts Germany 2–1 in the ninth place playoff, with Curtis scoring a field goal in the 6th minute.

Senior National Team
Curtis was born in Palmerston North, New Zealand, and made her senior international debut in a four nations tournament in 2013.

References

1993 births
Living people
Female field hockey forwards
Field hockey players at the 2010 Summer Youth Olympics
New Zealand female field hockey players
Sportspeople from Palmerston North
Surbiton Hockey Club players